Bideford College is a mixed secondary school and sixth form located in Bideford in the English county of Devon. The principal is Claire Ankers.

History
It is the only state-funded secondary school in Bideford. In 2003, the college was awarded specialist science status as part of the specialist schools programme. Due to its specialist status, it received extra funding from the government for extending its educational activities.

On 28 June 2014 the then Secretary of State for Education, Michael Gove, visited the college.

Previously a foundation school administered by Devon County Council, the school converted to academy status in March 2016. The school is now part of the Launceston College Multi Academy Trust, but continues to coordinate with Devon County Council for admissions.

Site

In January 2006, the college won its bid to build a new multimillion-pound school site. Construction began in the summer of 2008 and the first phase was completed in 2010, ready for the start of the academic year in September. The second phase of the building, the outdoor sport pitches, was completed in July 2011. The £55 million new school was built on the old site and includes a media suite, library, sports hall, a hall known as 'The Devon Hall', and an artificial grass sports pitch. £32 million was funded from the Building Schools for the Future (BSF) programme.

The new buildings are:
 Abbotsham or A Block - English, Library, SEN and offices
 Brunel or B Block - History, Geography, Languages, RE, PSHE, Law and Sociology
 Chichester or C Block - Textiles and Food Technology
 Da Vinci or D Block - Art and Technology
 Elgar or E Block - Music
 Franklin or F Block - Science, Maths, and Health & Social Care
 Galileo or G Block - Science, Maths, ICT, Business and Health & Social Care
Hepworth or H Block - PE, Sports halls, Drama
Isaac or I Block - SEN, Library, ICT

Academics
Bideford College offers GCSEs and BTECs as programmes of study for pupils, while students in the sixth form have the option to study from a range of A Levels, OCR Nationals and further BTECs.

Performance  
Figures published by the UK Government in 2008 showed Bideford College had made significant improvements in the key stage 3 exams taken by 14-year-old students. Over the previous four years (2004 to 2007) the school's aggregate score for the exams in English, Maths and Science has risen from 177 to 237 out of 300. This placed Bideford College joint 21st nationally in the table of most improved secondary schools published by the DCSF. Bideford was also in the top 20 percent of schools nationally based on the progress made from year 7 to year 9.

Ofsted 2013
In 2013 inspection by Ofsted found that the school required improvement. Leadership and management had not brought about improvements sufficiently, examination results for Key Stage 4 students were not as good as they should be, and the quality of teaching was not consistently good or better because some lessons did not engage all students. Inspectors found improvements in new buildings, student attendance, learning support, and said that bullying was rare.

Ofsted 2015
In 2015 the school was judged as inadequate state and requiring special measures. The principal, Veronica Matthews, and chairman of governors, Doug Bushby, resigned a week prior to the report's release, which had raised suspicions over the result, since OFSTED said that "Leaders have failed to tackle the key issues identified at the previous inspection" and that "Governors have little understanding of the reasons why students underachieve, they are over reliant on information from the Principal." The Sixth Form was also deemed inadequate, learning was not checked thoroughly by teachers during lessons, literacy skills were not developed well enough, and disadvantaged students made poor progress compared to their peers.

An interim principal, Andrew Kilpatrick, was appointed until current principal Lyndsey Kane took over.

Ofsted 2018
Another OFSTED inspection took place in 2018, and the school was judged as Requiring Improvement. Lyndsey Kane's principalship was praised for bringing "about improvement in pupils’ behaviour and attendance. She has stabilised the school and earned the respect of pupils and parents and carers." A lot of the problems were improved from 2013, although the teaching was deemed "not yet consistently good".

Ofsted 2022
The school was inspected again in 2022 and judged Good.

Behaviour

Concerns were raised about pupil safety when a video was released showing fighting in the school grounds, leading to discussions regarding pupils' physical and mental health.

Since September 2022 when a new Academy Trust were appointed, Bideford College have increased the strictness of their behaviour policies, from minor infractions including preventing children from holding pencils and putting on their glasses, as well as refusing to follow SEN structures and guidelines. This has led to pupils and parents striking in protest.

References

External links
Bideford College official website

Secondary schools in Devon
Academies in Devon